Atanasescu is an Aromanian and Romanian surname. Notable people with this surname include:

 Constantin Atanasescu (1885–1949), Romanian World War II lieutenant general
 Dimitri Atanasescu (1836–1907), Aromanian teacher at the first Romanian school for the Aromanians in the Balkans

Aromanian-language surnames
Romanian-language surnames